Guzmania lychnis is a plant species in the genus Guzmania. This species is native to Venezuela, Colombia, and Ecuador.

References

lychnis
Flora of South America
Plants described in 1953